The 2018 MTV Movie & TV Awards was held on June 16, 2018, from the Barker Hangar in Santa Monica, California, U.S. and was broadcast on June 18, 2018. Similar to the 2016 MTV Movie Awards, the event was not aired live and was pre-recorded on June 16 prior to its June 18 broadcast date. It was the 27th edition of the awards and the second to jointly honor movies and television. The ceremony was hosted by Tiffany Haddish.

Performers
MTV announced the first few performers on May 23, 2018.
 Chloe x Halle – "Warrior"/"The Kids Are Alright"
 DJ Mustard and Nick Jonas – "Anywhere"

Presenters
The first few presenters were revealed on May 23, 2018 with the performers.
 Michael B. Jordan and Mila Kunis – Presented "Best Scene Stealer" 
 Lil Rel Howery & Kyrie Irving – Presented "Best Frightened Performance"
 Olivia Munn and Zazie Beetz – Presented "Best Hero"
 Francia Raisa and Yara Shahidi – Introduced Chloe x Halle
 Alisha Boe, Dylan Minnette, Katherine Langford & Miles Heizer – Presented "Best Kiss"
 Kristen Bell and Seth Rogen – Presented "Best Comedic Performance"
 Charlamagne tha God, Halsey & Lil Yachty – Presented "Best Reality Series"
 Lakeith Stanfield & Tessa Thompson – Presented "Best Villain"
 Alison Brie and Betty Gilpin – Introduced DJ Mustard and Nick Jonas
 Common – Presented "Trailblazer Award" to Lena Waithe
 Cast of Jersey Shore – Presented "Best On-Screen Team"(Michael Sorrentino, Vinny Guadagnino, Paul DelVecchio, Deena Nicole Cortese and Ronnie Ortiz-Magro)
 Camila Mendes, Madelaine Petsch & Lili Reinhart – Presented "Best Performance in a Show"
 Bryce Dallas Howard & Aubrey Plaza – Presented "Generation Award" to Chris Pratt
 Zendaya – Presented "Best Performance in a Movie"
 Mandy Moore and Amandla Stenberg – Presented "Best Show"
 Lady Gaga – Presented "Best Movie"

Winners and nominees
The full list of nominees was announced on May 3, 2018. Winners are listed first, in bold.

MTV Generation Award
 Chris Pratt

MTV Trailblazer Award
Lena Waithe

Multiple nominations

Film
The following movies received multiple nominations:
 Seven – Black Panther
 Four – It, Girls Trip
 Three – Avengers: Infinity War, Star Wars: The Last Jedi, Wonder Woman
 Two – Jumanji: Welcome to the Jungle, Ready Player One, Thor: Ragnarok, Call Me By Your Name, Love, Simon

Television
The following television series received multiple nominations:
 Seven – Stranger Things
 Four – Riverdale
 Three – Game of Thrones 
 Two – 13 Reasons Why

References

External links
 MTV Movie & TV Awards official site

MTV Movie & TV Awards
MTV Movie Awards
2018 in Los Angeles
2017 in American cinema
MTV Movie